Kaniska canace, the blue admiral, is a nymphalid butterfly, the only species of the genus Kaniska. It is found in south and southeast Asia.

Subspecies
Subspecies are:
 K. c. canace (Linnaeus, 1763) (Sikkim, Myanmar, southern China, Hong Kong)
 K. c. battakana (de Nicéville, 1896) (Sumatra)
 K. c. benguetana (Semper, 1888) (Luzon)
 K. c. charonia (Drury, 1770)
 K. c. charonides (Stichel, [1908]) (Ussuri River)
 K. c. drilon (Fruhstorfer, 1912) (Taiwan)
 K. c. haronica (Moore, 1879) (Sri Lanka)
 K. c. ishima (Fruhstorfer, 1899) (Japan)
 K. c. javanica (Fruhstorfer, 1912) (Java, ?Bali, ?Lombok)
 K. c. maniliana (Fruhstorfer, 1912) (Borneo, ?Palau)
 K. c. muscosa (Tsukada & Nishiyama, 1979) (Sulawesi)
 K. c. nojaponicum (von Siebold, 1824) (Japan)
 K. c. perakana (Distant, 1886) (?Thailand, Malaysia)
 K. c. viridis Evans, 1924 south India

Description

Adult

The upperside of forewings and hindwings is black, while the underside is black and brown. Also the body is completely black. Forewings have a blue band at the wavy outer edge, a blue or white spot at the wing leading edge and a little white spot in the wing tip. Hindwings show a wide blue transversal band, with a row a small black spots and a narrow blue band at the outer very wavy edge.

Frederic Moore wrote in 1899:

Larva

Subspecies K. c. canace "Segments alternately orange and white, with numerous black spots on the orange segments and black streaks on the white; seven white, branching, black-tipped spines on each orange segment."

Subspecies K. c. haronica "Light red; spotted with black, the segments divided by blackish and purple lines; anal segment slightly humped; segments armed with eight longitudinal rows of yellow branched spines; head and legs black. Feeds on Smilax." (Moore, 1899)

Pupa
Subspecies K. c. canace "Variegated reddish brown, with frontal gold and silver spots; head produced and bifid."

Subspecies K. c. haronica "Reddish brown; abdominal segment with two dorsal rows of small reddish pointed tubercles; thorax angular; headpiece he is a good emperor produced and bifid." (Moore, 1899)

Biology 
Larvae grow on various Smilacaceae species (Smilax aspericaulis, Smilax zeylanica (in India), Smilax bracteata, Smilax china, Smilax lanceifolia, Smilax perfoliata, Smilax riparia, Smilax sebeana, Smilax sieboldii, Heterosmilax japonica) and Convallariaceae species (Streptopus amplexifolius, Tricyrtis hirta) and Liliaceae (Lilium lancifolium).

Habits
This species is highly territorial and will chase butterflies that move into its territory. It uses well defined perches and will bask with wings open but often sits with half-open wings.

Distribution
This very widespread species can be found as far north as southeastern Siberia, east to Korea, Japan and Taiwan, west to India and south to Sri Lanka, Myanmar and parts of Indonesia, with a number of well marked geographic races.

See also
 Anglewing butterflies

References

External link

Nymphalini
Fauna of Pakistan
Butterflies of Asia
Butterflies described in 1763
Taxa named by Carl Linnaeus